Karamabad (also Romanized as Karamābād; also known as Karīmābād) is a village in Doab Rural District, in the Central District of Selseleh County, Lorestan Province, Iran. At the 2006 census, its population was 24, in 5 families.

References 

Towns and villages in Selseleh County